Reading is an unincorporated community in Columbiana County, in the U.S. state of Ohio.

Reading was platted around 1840.

References

Unincorporated communities in Columbiana County, Ohio
1840 establishments in Ohio
Populated places established in 1840
Unincorporated communities in Ohio